Ha-eun, also spelled Ha-un, is a Korean feminine given name. Its meaning differs based on the hanja used to write each syllable of the name. There are 30 hanja with the reading "ha" and 30 hanja with the reading "eun" on the South Korean government's official list of hanja which may be registered for use in given names. It was the eighth-most popular name for newborn girls in South Korea in 2011.

People with this name include:

Kim Ha-eun (born 1984), South Korean actress
Yang Ha-eun (born 1994), South Korean table tennis player

See also
List of Korean given names

References

Korean feminine given names